Chegerd may refer to:
 Chegerd, Khash
 Chegerd, Mehrestan
 Chegerd, Sib and Suran